This is a list of notable footballers who have played for Crystal Palace F.C. Generally, this means players that have played 100 or more first-class matches for the club. A number of other players who have played an important role have also been included for their contributions; for example, Attilio Lombardo and Don Rogers.

This page also lists recipients of the Player of the Year and Young Player of the Year, and players who have been named in the PFA Team of the Year, while playing for the club.

Players are listed according to the date of their first-team debut. Appearances and goals are for first-team competitive matches only; wartime matches are excluded. Substitute appearances are included.

Current squad

Players

Statistics correct as of match played 19 March 2023

Player of the Year

Young Player of the Year

  Gary Stebbing – 1983
  Gary Stebbing – 1984
  Dave Lindsay – 1985
  Richard Shaw – 1986
  John Salako – 1987
  John Salako – 1988
  David Stevens – 1989
  Simon Osborn – 1990
  Dean Gordon – 1991
  Mark Hawthorne – 1992
  George Ndah – 1993
  Brian Launders – 1994
 No award from 1995–2001
  Julian Gray – 2002
  Wayne Routledge – 2003
  Wayne Routledge – 2004
  Tom Soares – 2005
  Ben Watson – 2006
  Gary Borrowdale – 2007
  Sean Scannell – 2008
  Nathaniel Clyne – 2009
  Nathaniel Clyne – 2010
  Wilfried Zaha – 2011
  Wilfried Zaha – 2012
  Jon Williams – 2013
  Joel Ward – 2014

Development Player of the Year
The Young Player of the Year award was renamed Development Player of the Year in 2015.

  Sullay Kaikai - 2015
  Hiram Boateng - 2016
  Aaron Wan-Bissaka - 2018

PFA Team of the Year
The following have been included in the PFA Team of the Year while playing for Crystal Palace:

  Derek Jeffries – Third Division 1975 (Third Tier)
  Peter Taylor – Third Division 1975 (Third Tier)
  Ian Evans – Third Division 1976 (Third Tier)
  Derek Jeffries – Third Division 1976 (Third Tier)
  Peter Taylor – Third Division 1976 (Third Tier)
  Ian Evans – Third Division 1977 (Third Tier)
  Kenny Sansom – Third Division 1977 (Third Tier)
  Kenny Sansom – Second Division 1978 (Second Tier)
  Kenny Sansom – Second Division 1979 (Second Tier)
  Kenny Sansom – First Division 1980 (First Tier)
  Mark Bright – Second Division 1988 (Second Tier)
  Ian Wright – Second Division 1989 (Second Tier)
  Nigel Martyn – First Division 1994 (Second Tier)
  Dean Gordon – First Division 1996 (Second Tier)
  Dougie Freedman – First Division 2002 (Second Tier)
  Andrew Johnson – First Division 2004 (Second Tier)
  Andrew Johnson – Premier League 2005 (First Tier)
  Nathaniel Clyne – Championship 2012 (Second Tier)
  Glenn Murray – Championship 2013 (Second Tier)
  Wilfried Zaha – Championship 2013 (Second Tier)
  Yannick Bolasie – Championship 2013 (Second Tier)

References
List of Palace Player Appearances – official site
List of Palace Golascorers – official site

Players
 
Crystal Palace F.C.
Association football player non-biographical articles